Pablo Elier Sánchez Salgado is a Cuban football manager, currently managing Cuba.

Managerial career
From 2013 to 2018, Sánchez was manager of Cuban club Pinar del Río. In July 2019, Sánchez was appointed manager of Cuba after previously being in a physical trainer capacity for the country.

Managerial Statistics

References

Date of birth missing (living people)
Year of birth missing (living people)
Living people
Cuba national football team managers
Cuban football managers